This list of Maronites  includes prominent Maronite figures who are notable in their areas of expertise.

Arts, culture, and entertainment

Joseph Abboud, American fashion designer
Amin al-Rihani, poet
Gibran Khalil Gibran, artist and writer
Youssef Howayek, sculptor
Tony Kanaan, race car driver
Joseph Philippe Karam, architect
Najwa Karam, singer
Mario Kassar, Hollywood producer, behind such movies as Rambo, Terminator II and Stargate
Callie Khouri, screenwriter
Elissa Khoury, singer
Marwan Khoury, singer
Nadine Labaki, actress and director
Mika, singer
George Daniel, present Commissioner of the National Lacrosse League.
Kathy Najimy, actress
Octavia Nasr, CNN editor
Elie Saab, International fashion designer
Baba Saad, German rapper of Lebanese descent
Nicole Saba, singer
Michael Sallah, Pulitzer Prize reporter
Elie Samaha, filmmaker
Tony Shalhoub, three-time Emmy Award and Golden Globe-winning American television and film actor
Danny Thomas, actor and founder of St. Jude Children's Research Hospital
Gabriel Yared, Oscar-winning musician for the soundtrack of The English Patient
Mario Zagallo (Zakhour), former Brazil national football team, player and coach
Nawal Al Zoghbi
Tom Shadyac, Hollywood producer and director
Tiny Tim, musician

Business

Carlos Ghosn, Lebanese-French-Brazilian industrialist, CEO of Nissan and Renault
George J. Maloof, Jr., entrepreneur
Tarek Saab, former contestant on The Apprentice and President of Texas Precious Metals and Fibonacci.com
Carlos Slim, Lebanese-Mexican, CEO of Teléfonos de México (Telmex) and many other companies in Mexico, and from 2010 to 2013, he was considered as the richest man in the world by Forbes.
Gilbert Chagoury, businessman and philanthropist

Government and politics

Ecuador
Abdalá Bucaram, former President of Ecuador
Alberto Dahik, former Vice President of Ecuador
Jamil Mahuad, former President of Ecuador (1998–2000)
Jaime Nebot, Ecuadorian politician
Julio Teodoro Salem, former President of Ecuador

Argentina
Juan Luis Manzur, Argentinian Minister of Health and Environment

Sierra Leone
 Edward J. Akar, former Sierra Leone Minister of Finance
 John Saad, former Sierra Leone Minister of Housing and Infrastructural Development
 Joe Blell, former Sierra Leone Minister of Defence

Uruguay
 Alberto Abdala, politician, painter and former Vice-President of Uruguay

Canada
 Patricia Arab, member of the Legislative Assembly of Nova Scotia, Canada
 Mark Assad, Canadian politician
 Michael Basha, former member of the Senate of Canada
 Pierre de Bané, Canadian Senator
 Lena Diab, Attorney General, Minister of Justice and Minister of Immigration for the Province of Nova Scotia, Canada
 Eddie Francis, mayor of Windsor, Ontario
 Joe Ghiz, premier of Prince Edward Island, Canada
 Robert Ghiz, premier of Prince Edward Island, Canada
 Mac Harb, Canadian politician
 Marie Henein, Canadian lawyer
 Lorraine Michael, Canadian politician
 Maria Mourani, member of Canadian Parliament
 Frank Zakem, mayor of Charlottetown
 Paul Zed, Lebanese-Canadian politician

Guatemala
 Jorge Serrano Elías, former president of Guatemala

Jamaica
 Edward Seaga, former Prime Minister of Jamaica

Brazil
Paulo Maluf, former governor of São Paulo state
Michel Temer, former president of Brazil

Australia
 Alexander Alam, political leader, member of the Australian Labor Party
 Marie Bashir, Governor of New South Wales, Australia
 Steve Bracks, former Premier of Victoria, Australia
 George Joseph, former Lord Mayor of Adelaide
 Bob Katter, Australian politician

U.S.
John Abizaid, former Commander in Chief of the US Central Command
Spencer Abraham, former United States Senator and Secretary of Energy
Ray LaHood, U.S. Secretary of Transportation
George Mitchell, 17th United States Senate Majority Leader
Donna Shalala, former US Secretary of Health
Francis G. Slay, mayor of St. Louis, Missouri
George Joulwan, Supreme Allied Commander, Europe (SACEUR) from 1993 to 1997
Rony Seikaly, basketball player at Syracuse University, 1st round draft pick of the NBA's Miami Heat in 1988
Matt Freije, former Lebanese NBA player drafted by the Miami Heat who also played for the New Orleans Pelicans and the Atlanta Hawks from 2004-2006

Lebanon
Pierre-Georges Arlabosse, President of the French Mandate of Lebanon (4–9 April 1941)
Camille Chamoun, President of the Lebanese Republic (23 September 1952 – 22 September 1958), founder of the Ahrar Party, one of the fathers of the Lebanese Independence
Fuad Chehab, President of the Lebanese Republic (23 September 1958 – 22 September 1964)
Émile Eddé, President of the French Mandate of Lebanon (20 January 1936 – 4 April 1941) and President of the French Mandate of Lebanon (11 November 1943 – 22 November 1943)
Bashir Gemayel, Lebanese military commander, politician, and president-elect. Founder of the Lebanese Forces
Pierre Gemayel, politician, founder of Al-Kataeb party in Lebanon
Salim Joubran, judge in the Israeli high court of justice
Youssef Bey Karam, Lebanese Nationalist Leader
Bechara El Khoury, President of the Lebanese Republic (22 November 1943–18 September 1952)
Amine Gemayel, President of the Lebanese Republic (23 September 1982–22 September 1988)
Bachir Gemayel, President of the Lebanese Republic (23 August 1982–14 September 1982)
Charles Helou, President of the Lebanese Republic (23 September 1964–22 September 1970)
Elias Hrawi, President of the Lebanese Republic (24 November 1989–24 November 1998)
Alfred Naccache, acting President of the French Mandate of Lebanon (9 April 1941–18 March 1943)
Émile Lahoud, President of the Lebanese Republic (24 November 1998–23 November 2007)
René Moawad, President of the Lebanese Republic (5 November 1989–22 November 1989)
Etienne Saqr ("Abu Arz"), Lebanese military commander and politician, leader of Guardians of the Cedars
Elias Sarkis, President of the Lebanese Republic (23 September 1976–22 September 1982)
Bashir Shihab II, emir who ruled Lebanon in the first half of the 19th century
Youssef Salim Karam, former MP and leader from Zgharta (10 April 1910–4 February 1972)
Salim Bey Karam, MP and former minister from Zgharta
Ziad Mikhael AKl, founder and president of YASA, lawyer

Religion

Nimattullah Kassab Al-Hardini, Lebanese monk and priest, Catholic saint.
Peter Ambarach, pioneer of printing in oriental languages and Bible linguist under Pope Clement XI.
Giuseppe Luigi Assemani, Vatican orientalist.
Giuseppe Simone Assemani, titular archbishop of Tyre, librarian of the Vatican and an authority on oriental manuscripts.
Simone Assemani, professor of Oriental languages in Padua.
Stefano Evodio Assemani, titular Archbishop of Apamaea in Syria and Vatican orientalist.
Domnina of Syria, disciple of Saint Maron, Catholic Saint.
Abraham Ecchellensis, theologian famous for his translations of biblical texts into Arabic and Syriac.
Theodore Khoury, prominent Catholic theologian.
Marina, Lebanese female monk and "desert father", Catholic saint.
John Maron, first Maronite Patriarch in history, Catholic saint.
Maroun, Aramean-Syriac monk, founder of the Maronite religious movement, Catholic saint.
Mitch Pacwa, S.J., Maronite priest and television personality on EWTN.
Rafqa Pietra Choboq Ar-Rayès, saint, canonized by Pope John Paul II.
Victor Scialac, theologian and linguist, is thought to have given his name to Shylock, the main character in Shakespeare's The Merchant of Venice.
Gabriel Sionita, theologian famous for his role in the publication of the 1645 Parisian polyglot of the Bible.
Tobia Aun, archbishop, played role in 1860 Lebanon conflict.

Science

 Peter Medawar, 1960 Nobel Prize winner in Medicine.
Charles Elachi, Director of NASA Jet Propulsion Labs
Christa McAuliffe, secondary school teacher and first American civilian selected to be an astronaut; perished in the Space Shuttle Challenger disaster. Great-niece of historian Philip Khuri Hitti.

Sports
Joe Lahoud, Lebanese-American baseball player
Miguel Layún, Lebanese-Mexican footballer
Karen Mattar, Lebanese Dubai based Prominent Yoga instructor and internet star

References

Maronites
 
Maronites
Maronites